This is a list of electronic organ makers.

Brazil
Bonh (Sistemas Johannus - Novo Hamburgo - RS)
Tokai (Antiga Minami, é também a maior fabricante de órgãos da américa latina e do mundo)
Harmonia (setembro de 2012)
Digital Acordes
Gambitt (Uma das marcas mais clássicas do Brasil)
Saema
Phinker
DualKey
Tocamais
Schieffer
Grace
Koller
Rohnes
Yahalom

Canada
Artisan Classic Organ Inc. (dba Classic Organ Works) - Markham, Ontario
The Classic Organ Company Ltd. - Markham, Ontario
Hallman Organ Co. - Kitchener, Ontario
Minshall Organ Company - London, Ontario
Phoenix Organs – Peterborough, Ontario
The Robb Wave Organ Company – Belleville, Ontario
Northern Electric - (manufacturer of Hammond organs) - Belleville, Ontario and Montreal, Quebec

China
Hsin-Hai Teodorico PC Organ (in cooperation with Hauptwerk) – Beijing
Ringway – Changzhou, Jiangsu

Denmark
Brdr. Joergensen (Manufacturer of Hammond organs) - Soenderborg, Denmark

Finland 
 Walton
 WLM-Organ

Germany 
 Ahlborn Orgel – Heimerdingen
 Dr. Böhm
 Hoffrichter Orgel – Salzwedel
 Wersi
 Hohner

Italy 
 Armon (company) – Porto Recanati (1970s)
 Bontempi - Potenza Picena
 Crumar
 Farfisa – Osimo
 Generalmusic (GEM)
 Orla - Castelfidardo
 Viscount International – Mondaino
Eko
Jen
Elgam
Elka
Siel
Ketron
Logan
CRB

Japan
Kawai Musical Instruments
Korg
Roland Corporation
Technics (brand)
Yamaha Corporation
JVC Victron
Hammond Suzuki
ACE tone
Casio

The Netherlands
Content Organs Holland
 Eminent Organs – Bodegraven (closed), Lelystad (since 1994)
Johannus – Ede
Bemore instruments
RiHa
Phillips

South Korea
Kurzweil Music Systems

Sweden
Clavia Digital Musical Instruments

United Kingdom
 Bird
 JMI Jennings Musical Industries - VOX
John Compton Organ Company of Acton – Nottingham and London (now Makin Organs)
Copeman Hart Organs — Shaw (now part of ChurchOrganWorld)
Eminent UK — Designer of British organs and exclusive distributor of the Eminent brand. Based in Wincanton.
Maestrovox
Makin Organs — Shaw (now part of ChurchOrganWorld)
Wyvern Organs – Kirdford

United States
Ahlborn-Galanti – Bensenville, Illinois (division of family company, Generalmusic)
Allen Organ Company – Macungie, Pennsylvania
Baldwin Piano Company – Nashville, Tennessee
C.G. Conn – Chicago, Illinois (closed)
Gulbransen
Hammond Organ Company – Chicago, Illinois
Lowrey Organ Company – Chicago, Illinois
Marshall & Ogletree – Needham, Massachusetts 
Rodgers Instruments – Hillsboro, Oregon (owned by parent company  Vandeweerd in Netherland, owner of Johannus)
Thomas Organ Company 
Walker Technical Company - Center Valley, Pennsylvania

Lists of musical instrument manufacturing companies